Indian singer and music director Ankit Tiwari started his singing career in 2011 with the release of the film Saheb, Biwi Aur Gangster, where he composed and rendered the song "Saheb Bada Hatila". Though the song did not get much recognition in the musical platforms, his next release "Sunn Raha Hai" from Aashiqui 2 (2013) has attained general acclaim from music critics. Tiwari received his first nomination of Filmfare Award for Best Male Playback Singer for the film. He also won Filmfare Award for Best Music Director along with Mithoon & Jeet Gannguli for the same film.  He received nomination from IIFA and Star Guild Awards and won the Mirchi's "Upcoming Male Vocalist of the Year" award for the song. It also fetched him several other awards for Best Music Director category. During the year he also did playback for a song titled "Aag Ka Dariya" from Issaq.

In 2014, Tiwari had eleven songs released and collaborated with different music directors; Shamir Tandon for Dee Saturday Night, Ismail Darbar for Kaanchi..., Ram Sampath for Purani Jeans and Himesh Reshammiya for two of his films, The Xposé and Action Jackson. He also sang a duet with Shreya Ghoshal–who had earlier worked with him in the female version of "Sunn Raha Hai"–for the song "Tequila Wakila" in Samrat & Co.. The year marks the first time, Tiwari dubbed for Aamir Khan, in the song "Dil Darbadar" from PK. He also composed a song for Singham Returns. Out of all the releases during the year, the most successful song happened to be "Galliyan" from Ek Villain, for which he received Filmfare Award for Best Male Playback Singer and received a nomination of Filmfare Award for Best Music Director along with Mithoon & Soch. He also won Stardust Awards, BIG Star Entertainment Awards and Star Guild Awards. In 2015, he composed or sang for Alone, Khamoshiyan, Roy, Badmashiyaan, Mr. X, All Is Well (film), Bhaag Johnny, Kuch Kuch Locha Hai, Ishqedarriyaan, Tanu Weds Manu Returns. He won again Filmfare Award for Best Music Director for Roy along with Amaal Mallik & Meet Bros. He also received a nomination of Filmfare Award for Best Male Playback Singer for the same film. In 2016, Tiwari sang or composed for Wazir, Airlift, Sanam Teri Kasam, Sanam Re, Baaghi, Tum Bin II, Junooniyat, Rustom, Rocky Handsome, Ishq Junoon, Beiimaan Love. He received another nomination of Filmfare Award for Best Music Director along with Amaal Mallik, Meet Bros & Manj Musik for Baaghi. In 2017, he only composed a song for Baadshaho. In 2018, he composed & sang a song with Palak Muchhal for Aiyaary. He also sang a song for Baaghi 2 with shruti pathak.

Hindi film songs

2011

2013

2014

2015

2016

2017

2018

2019

2020

2021

2022

Non-film Hindi and Non-Hindi songs

As music director

References

Lists of songs recorded by Indian singers